John Robert "Bob" Churchill (born 21 February 1939) is a former three positional small bore rifle shooter, who shot for the British National team in the seventies and eighties. He competed in the 50 metre rifle, three positions event at the 1972 Summer Olympics.  At the 1978 Seoul ISSF World Shooting Championships, he was gold medalist for both individual and — alongside Barry Dagger and Malcolm Cooper — the men's team events for the 50m free rifle kneeling 40 shots, kneeling position. For many years, he was a member of the Tunbridge Wells Target Shooting club as well as clubs in Somerset. In 1981, he co-wrote Modern Air Weapon Shooting with Granville Davies.

References

External links
ISSF Athlete Profile

1939 births
Living people
British male sport shooters
Olympic shooters of Great Britain
Shooters at the 1972 Summer Olympics